Match of the Day Kickabout is a British children's television football programme broadcast on CBBC. It was previously presented by Ore Oduba and Radzi Chinyanganya. but in its later seasons it was hosted by Ben Shires, Kenzie Benali, John Farnworth and Liam MacDevitt. It was a spin-off from the long running weekly Match of the Day. It also replaced former Newsround spin-off Sportsround.

Format
The show features special guests, funny quizzes, and footballers answering questions about their team-mates. It also includes Premier League highlights, the WSL and the SPFL, formats called Rated and Street Five, and child-oriented videos called Your Skills.

External links

BBC Sport
BBC Television shows
Premier League on television
BBC children's television shows
2011 British television series debuts
2021 British television series endings
2010s British children's television series
2010s British sports television series
2020s British children's television series
2020s British sports television series